The 1998–99 Logan Cup was a first-class cricket competition held in Zimbabwe from 5 January 1999 – 21 January 1999. It was won by Matabeleland, who were the only team to complete two matches, winning one and drawing the other, to top the table.

Points table

References

1999 in Zimbabwean cricket
Domestic cricket competitions in 1998–99
Logan Cup